The 2018 Vuelta a España was a three-week Grand Tour cycling stage race that took place in Spain between 25 August and 16 September 2018. The race was the 73rd edition of the Vuelta a España and was the final Grand Tour of the 2018 cycling season. The race started in Málaga and finished in Madrid.

The race was won by British rider Simon Yates from the team .

Teams

The starting teams include:

Pre-race favourites
Four former winners started the race; Nairo Quintana, Alejandro Valverde (both from ), Vincenzo Nibali and Fabio Aru. The other riders considered contenders for the general classification were Richie Porte, Simon Yates, Miguel Ángel López, Michał Kwiatkowski, Wilco Kelderman, Steven Kruijswijk, Thibaut Pinot and Rigoberto Urán.

Route and stages

Classification leadership 

The Vuelta a España had four individual classifications, for which jerseys were awarded daily to the leading rider, as well as a team competition. The primary classification was the general classification, which was calculated by adding each rider's finishing times on each stage. Time bonuses were awarded at the end of every stage apart from the two individual time trials. The rider with the lowest cumulative time was the leader of the general classification, and wears the red jersey. The leader of the general classification at the end of the race was considered the overall winner of the Vuelta a España.

The second classification was the points classification. Riders received points for finishing among the highest placed in a stage finish, or in intermediate sprints during the stage. The points available for each stage finish were determined by the stage's type. The leader was identified by a green jersey.

The next classification was the mountains classification. Points were awarded to the riders that reached the summit of the most difficult climbs first. The climbs were categorized, in order of increasing difficulty, third-, second-, and first- and special-category. The leader wore a white jersey with blue polka dots.

The final of the individual classifications was the combination classification. A rider's ranking in the combination classification was determined by tallying up his positions in the general, points, and mountains classifications. The leader wore a white jersey. If no rider was classified in all three classifications, riders classified in two would have been considered, and if that was tied the general classification will decide the winner.

There was also the team classification. After each stage, the times of the three highest finishers of each team are added together. The victory was awarded to the team with the lowest cumulative time at the end of the event.

In addition, there were two individual awards: the combativity award and the young rider award. The combativity award was given after each stage to the rider "who displayed the most generous
effort and best sporting spirit." The daily winner wore a green number bib the following stage. At the end of the Vuelta, a jury decides the top three riders for the "Most Combative Rider of La Vuelta", with a public vote deciding the victor. The young rider award is calculated the same way as the general classification, but the classification was restricted to riders who were born on or after 1 January 1993. The leader wore a red number bib.

A total of €1,120,000 will be awarded in cash prizes in the race. The overall winner of the general classification will receive €150,335, with the second and third placed riders getting €57,000 and €30,000 respectively. All finishers in the top 20 were awarded with money. The holders of the four individual classifications benefited on each stage they led. The final winners of the points and combined were given €11,000, while the mountains classification got €23,100 and the most combative rider got €3,000. The team classification winners were given €12,500. €11,000 was given to the winners of each stage of the race, with smaller amounts given to places 2–20. There was also a special award with a prize of €1,000, the Cima Alberto Fernández, given to first rider to reach the summit of the highest mountain of the race.

Final classification standings

General classification

Points classification

Mountains classification

Combination classification

Team classification

Notes and references

Footnotes

References

Sources

External links 

 

 
2018
2018 UCI World Tour
2018 in Spanish road cycling
2018 in Andorran sport
August 2018 sports events in Spain
September 2018 sports events in Spain